Charles John Bloomfield White (9 March 1874 – 15 October 1941) was a rugby union player who represented Australia.

White, a wing, was born in Maitland, NSW and claimed three international rugby caps for Australia. His Test debut was against Great Britain at Sydney on 24 June 1899, the inaugural rugby Test match played by an Australian national representative side.

Published references
 Collection (1995) Gordon Bray presents The Spirit of Rugby, Harper Collins Publishers Sydney
 Howell, Max (2005) Born to Lead - Wallaby Test Captains, Celebrity Books, Auckland NZ

Footnotes

Australian rugby union players
Australia international rugby union players
1874 births
1941 deaths
Rugby union players from Maitland, New South Wales
Rugby union wings